is a city located in Yamagata Prefecture, Japan. , the city had an estimated population of 29,617 in 11278  households, and a population density of 120 persons per km2.

Geography
Kaminoyama is located in southeast Yamagata Prefecture, in the Murayama Basin, bordered by Miyagi Prefecture to the east. Mount Zaō is located within its borders.

Neighboring municipalities
Yamagata Prefecture
Yamagata, Yamagata
Nanyo, Yamagata
Takahata, Yamagata
Miyagi Prefecture
Kawasaki, Miyagi
Shichikashuku, Miyagi

Climate
Kaminoyama has a Humid continental climate (Köppen climate classification Cfa) with large seasonal temperature differences, with warm to hot (and often humid) summers and cold (sometimes severely cold) winters. This includes heavy amounts of snowfall from late November until early March. Precipitation is significant throughout the year, but is heaviest from August to October. The average annual temperature in Kaminoyama is 11.4 °C. The average annual rainfall is 1362 mm with September as the wettest month. The temperatures are highest on average in August, at around 24.9 °C, and lowest in January, at around -1.1 °C.

Demographics
Per Japanese census data, the population of Kaminoyama has declined over the past 40 years.

History
The area of present-day Kaminoyama was part of ancient Dewa Province, and was a castle town for Kaminoyama Domain under the Tokugawa shogunate in the Edo period. It was also a post station on the Ushū Kaidō highway. After the start of the Meiji period, the area became part of Minamimurayama District, Yamagata Prefecture. The town of Kaminoyama was established on April 1, 1889 with the establishment of the modern municipalities system, and was elevated to city status on October 1, 1954.

Government
Higashine has a mayor-council form of government with a directly elected mayor and a unicameral city legislature of 15 members. The city contributes one member to the Yamagata Prefectural Assembly.  In terms of national politics, the city is part of Yamagata District 1 of the lower house of the Diet of Japan.

Economy
The economy of Kaminoyama is based on agriculture (horticulture), light manufacturing (electronics, automotive components, clothing, foodstuffs), forestry and tourism. This region is famous for its hot spring water and hot spring resorts near the former grounds of Kaminoyama Castle

Education
Kaminoyama has five public elementary schools and three public middle schools operated by the city government and one public high schools operated by the Yamagata Prefectural Board of Education. The prefecture also operates one special education school for the handicapped and two vocational training schools.

Transportation

Railway
 East Japan Railway Company - Yamagata Shinkansen
 
 East Japan Railway Company - Ōu Main Line
  -  -

Highways
  – Yamagata-Kamiyama Interchange, Kaminoyama-Minami Interchange

Local attractions

Kaminoyama Castle
Sky Tower 41
Saito Mokichi Memorial Museum
Kaminoyama Onsen

International relations

Twin towns — Sister cities
 Donaueschingen, Baden-Württemberg, Germany,  since October 1, 1995.

Notable people from Kaminoyama
Masaru Akiba, professional soccer player 
Toshiaki Endo, politician 
Takeshi Koike, anime movie director, illustrator 
Mokichi Saitō, poet

References

External links

Official Website 
English Information 

 
Cities in Yamagata Prefecture